"Fallout" is a song recorded by Canadian pop punk band Marianas Trench for their third studio album, Ever After (2011). It was released November 14, 2011 as the album's second single. The song has peaked in the Top 40 on the Billboard Canadian Hot 100 and been certified Gold by Music Canada. In October 2016, "Fallout" was certified Double Platinum.

Content
"Fallout" is a pop rock song with a duration of four minutes and ten seconds. Its instrumentation consists primarily of drums and guitar, while its "krushed groove" and vocal arrangement have been described by CBC Music as having an R&B influence. The song's lyrics describe the pain of losing someone you love to another person.

Critical reception
Boris Canzano at Sputnik Music praised "Fallout" in his review of Ever After, writing "The best track on Ever After, Fallout... proves that Marianas Trench can take a pop cliché and mold it into something truly moving and meaningful." Catherine Yi at Pupfresh felt that "Fallout" was a "catchy, pleasing song" with strong radio potential, but that it offered too little musical or lyrically variation throughout.

Music video
The music video premiered on February 2, 2012 on MuchMusic. It is the second in a five-part video storyline, following "Haven't Had Enough" and continuing into "Desperate Measures".

Synopsis
The video starts with Josh Ramsay breaking up with his girlfriend (Darla Taylor) in an open minefield. She drives away, leaving him with a traditional-style key. As soon as she disappears, multiple explosions occur around Josh, who runs but eventually passes out. The other band members arrive near the end of the video and wake him up. Josh finds his girlfriend with another man (Jordan Weller), making out next to their car. Scenes of the band are also shown throughout the video performing the song in the same field with explosion effects.

Awards and nominations

Charts and certifications

Weekly charts

Year-end chart

Certifications

References

2011 songs
2011 singles
604 Records singles
Songs written by Josh Ramsay
Marianas Trench (band) songs